Daniele Ferretti (born 30 August 1986) is an Italian football player. He plays for  club Recanatese.

Club career
He spent the first seven seasons of his senior career in the fifth-tier Eccellenza and fourth-tier Lega Pro Seconda Divisione.

He made his professional debut in the 2011–12 season in Lega Pro Prima Divisione for Bassano.

For the 2019–20 season, his club Trapani advanced to the second-tier Serie B.

He made his Serie B debut for Trapani on 24 August 2019 in a game against Ascoli. He substituted Felice Evacuo at half-time and scored his first Serie B goal in an eventual 1–3 loss. He made his first Serie B start on 31 August 2019 in a game against Venezia.

On 31 January 2020, he signed a 1.5-year contract with Avellino.

On 14 September 2020, he moved to Ravenna on a season-long contract that would be automatically renewed if some conditions are met.

On 24 September 2021, he joined Sambenedettese in Serie D.

References

External links
 

1986 births
Sportspeople from the Province of Teramo
Footballers from Abruzzo
Living people
Italian footballers
Association football midfielders
Civitanovese Calcio players
A.C. Mezzocorona players
Bassano Virtus 55 S.T. players
S.S.D. Lucchese 1905 players
A.S. Gubbio 1910 players
Trapani Calcio players
U.S. Avellino 1912 players
Ravenna F.C. players
A.S. Sambenedettese players
U.S.D. Recanatese 1923 players
Serie B players
Serie C players
Serie D players